Chom Phon Akat or Marshal of the Royal Thai Air Force is a 5-star rank and the most senior rank in the Royal Thai Air Force.  It is equivalent to a Field Marshal (or Chom Phon) in the Royal Thai Army and an Admiral of the Fleet (or Chom Phon Ruea) in the Royal Thai Navy.  The rank of Marshal of the RTAF is also equivalent to the British rank of Marshal of the Royal Air Force.

The King of Thailand as Head of the Armed Forces is automatically made a Chom Phon upon accession. The rank was formally created in 1937, with the formal foundation of the Royal Siamese Air Force. Together with all other ranks of an independent air force.

Head of the Royal Thai Armed Forces

List of Marshal of the Royal Thai Air Force

See also

Military ranks of the Thai armed forces
Field marshal (Thailand) (Chom Phon): equivalent rank in the Royal Thai Army
Admiral of the fleet (Thailand) (Chom Phon Ruea): equivalent rank in the Royal Thai Navy
Marshal of the air force
Head of the Royal Thai Armed Forces

References 

Thailand
Thailand
Marshals of the Royal Thai Air Force